The Flatiron Challenge at Lacombe was a bonspiel, or curling tournament, that took place at the Lacombe Curling Club in Lacombe, Alberta. The tournament was one of the development series events introduced on the World Curling Tour during the 2012–13 curling season. The tournament was held in a round robin format.

It was held from October 19 to 21; the purse for the event was CAD$8,000, of which the winner, Robert Schlender, received CAD$2,000. Due to the lack of teams participating, the men's and women's events were combined, and both men's and women's teams played in one round robin competition.

Champions
Only skip's name is displayed.

Teams
The teams are listed as follows:

Round-robin standings
Final round-robin standings

Tiebreaker

Playoffs

References

External links

Former World Curling Tour events
Lacombe, Alberta
Curling in Alberta